Prince Chun of the First Rank (hošoi gulu cin wang), or simply Prince Chun, was the title of a princely peerage used in China during the Manchu-led Qing dynasty (1644–1912). It was also one of the 12 "iron-cap" princely peerages in the Qing dynasty, which meant that the title could be passed down without being downgraded.

The first bearer of the title was Yixuan (1840–1891), the seventh son of the Daoguang Emperor. He was awarded the title by his fourth brother, the Xianfeng Emperor, who succeeded their father. The title was passed down over two generations and held by only two persons – Yixuan and his fifth son, Zaifeng (1883–1951) – who were the biological fathers of the penultimate and last emperors of the Qing dynasty respectively.

Members of the Prince Chun peerage
 Yixuan (1840–1891), the Daoguang Emperor's seventh son, initially a junwang (second-rank prince) from 1850 to 1864, accorded qinwang (first-rank prince) status in 1864 and given a qinwang title in 1872. In 1874, his title, Prince Chun of the First Rank, was made hereditary. He was posthumously honoured as Prince Chunxian of the First Rank (醇賢親王).
 Zaiguang (載洸; 1880–1884), Yixuan's fourth son, had no male heir
 Zaifeng (1883–1951), Yixuan's fifth son, initially a buru bafen zhenguo gong from 1884 to 1891, held the title Prince Chun of the First Rank from 1891 to 1949
 Zaixun (1885–1949), Yixuan's sixth son, held a buru bafen fuguo gong title from 1887 to 1889 and a feng'en fuguo gong title from 1889 to 1902, adopted as Yizhi (Prince Rui)'s son
 Zaitao (1887–1970), Yixuan's seventh son, held a second class zhenguo jiangjun title from 1890 to 1893, adopted as Yihe (Prince Zhong)'s son

Family tree

See also
 Royal and noble ranks of the Qing dynasty

References
 

Qing dynasty princely peerages
Peerages of the Bordered White Banner